James McLean (1876–1914) was an English footballer who played in the Football League for Preston North End, Walsall and West Bromwich Albion.

Career
McLean played for Sneyd, before joining Burslem Port Vale in the summer of 1896. He made his debut at inside-right in a 4–2 defeat at Dresden United in a Staffordshire Senior Cup preliminary round replay on 26 October 1896. He made his Midland Football League debut five days later, scoring in a 3–2 defeat at Wellingborough Town. Despite the goal this was to be his final appearance for the club.

He finished his career at Preston together with James Wilson in summer 1911.

Career statistics
Source:

References

1876 births
1914 deaths
Footballers from Stoke-on-Trent
English footballers
Association football wing halves
Association football inside forwards
Port Vale F.C. players
Bristol Rovers F.C. players
Worcester City F.C. players
Walsall F.C. players
West Bromwich Albion F.C. players
Preston North End F.C. players
English Football League players